Birch Hall Inn is a public house founded around 1860 in Beck Hole in the North York Moors, England. It is designated as a Grade II listed building.
It is noted for its small bars and shop, and interior, and is popular with hiking tourists on holiday in the area.

History and description
There is documentary evidence of a building on the site dating to at least the 17th century. The original construction of the current building is thought date to the mid or late 18th century, consisting of a building of two single storey cottages. Contemporary with the arrival of the Whitby to Pickering Railway and the establishment of the Whitby Iron Company in Beckhole, in the mid 19th century, the landlords, Ralph and Mary Dowson added a second floor to the original cottages, and added a three storey extension to the building, originally used as a shop with tenements above for industrial workers.

The painter Algernon Newton created a pub sign for the inn during his stay in Beck Hole in the 1940s.

The main bar 'Big Bar' is within one of the original cottages, a second bar, the 'Little Bar' was added after the Second World War in the Victorian three storey extension. A very small shop in the building sells sweets and postcards. The building is Grade II listed, and the interior, relatively unchanged since the 1930s is listed in CAMRA's National Inventory of Historic Pub Interiors.

References

External links

National Inventory Pubs
Grade II listed pubs in North Yorkshire